Onnine Ibalgwan (Hangul: 언니네이발관), also known as Sister's Barbershop, was a South Korean modern rock band. The group debuted in 1996 with the album, Pigeon is a Rat in the Sky, which received rave reviews from critics and music fans. The group disbanded in 2017.

Discography 
 The Pigeon is the Sky's Rat (비둘기는 하늘의 쥐), 1996
 Reminiscences (후일담), 1998
 Dream Pop Song (꿈의 팝송), 2002
 Believe in the Moment (순간을 믿어요), 2004
 Most Ordinary Existence (가장 보통의 존재), 2008
 Those People By Themselves (홀로 있는 사람들), 2017

Awards

Korean Music Awards

References

External links 
 Official website (in Korean)

South Korean indie rock groups
Musical groups established in 1996
Musical groups disestablished in 2017